Koritnik is a wooded, limestone mountain, located in northeastern Albania and southwest Kosovo between the cities of Kukës and Prizren. The mountain is entirely surrounded by branches of the White Drin river. Gryka e Vanavës separates the mountain from Gjallica.

The massif falls within the Balkan mixed forests terrestrial ecoregion of the Palearctic temperate broadleaf and mixed forests biome. The slopes of the mountain meadows are mostly covered with coniferous forests.  The Koritnik mountain because of its high pastures contains a population of 60 chamois.

Koritnik falls within the Korab-Koritnik Nature Park, forming the European Green Belt. It has been recognised as an Important Plant Area of international importance by Plantlife.

See also 

 Korab-Koritnik Nature Park
 Geography of Albania
 Mountains of Albania

Notes

References 

 

Mountains of Albania
Mountains of Kosovo
International mountains of Europe
Albania–Kosovo border
Geography of Kukës County
Two-thousanders of Albania
Two-thousanders of Kosovo
Protected areas of Dibër County